The M-26–Cedar Creek Culvert is a short highway bridge located on M-26 over Cedar Creek in Eagle Harbor Township, Michigan. The Keweenaw County Road Commission built the bridge in 1930; they also built the M-26–Silver River Culvert and the US 41–Fanny Hooe Creek Bridge around the same time. The M-26–Cedar Creek Culvert was listed on the National Register of Historic Places in 1999.

Description
The M-26–Cedar Creek Culvert spans the mouth of Cedar Creek, immediately south of Lake Superior. The bridge is configured as a two-barrel, multi-plate steel culvert. Each of the arches are ringed with irregular stone voussoir veneers. The endwalls and parapet walls contain decorative fieldstones with grapevine mortar joints. The parapets are banded on both sides by heavy stone bulkheads having pyramidally shaped concrete caps. The bulkheads extend below the level of the road, and continue as pilasters along the sidewalls. The Cedar Creek Culvert is unaltered and in excellent condition.

See also

References

Buildings and structures in Keweenaw County, Michigan
Road bridges on the National Register of Historic Places in Michigan
Bridges completed in 1930
Transportation in Keweenaw County, Michigan
National Register of Historic Places in Keweenaw County, Michigan
Steel bridges in the United States
M-26 (Michigan highway)